Patricia Summersett (born March 15, 1982) is a Canadian actress, best known for voicing Princess Zelda in The Legend of Zelda: Breath of the Wild and Hyrule Warriors: Age of Calamity.

Life and career
Summersett has appeared in the Darren Aronofsky psychological horror mother!, in series: CBC's Bellevue starring Anna Paquin, CTV's The Disappearance with Peter Coyote, Go90's Lost Generation with Katie Findlay and scored by Tony-winning Duncan Sheik, and NBC's The Bold Type on Free Form. She also played a lead in the indie feature Maz by festival-winning filmmaker Federico Hidalgo. Notable past roles include recurring characters in Ron Moore's Helix s2 as well as 19-2 (Bravo/CTV). She was also the official “Onset Smurf” representing Smurfette, Vexy and Clumsy as the reference voice and puppeteer for the making of Sony's The Smurfs 2.

Education
She holds a BFA in theatre performance from Concordia University and a master's in classical acting from the Royal Central School of Speech and Drama. She has also studied acting at Moscow Art Theatre and National Theatre Conservatory. Before attending drama school, she trained for years as a competitive ice dancer, and held the title of Quebec Sectional Champion.

Video games
Summersett was revealed as the first official English voice of Princess Zelda in Nintendo's thirty-year The Legend of Zelda franchise with her work in The Legend of Zelda: Breath of the Wild. She has voiced many games from indie to AAA and provided full performance capture for two assassins in Ubisoft's Assassin's Creed series. Within Tom Clancy's Rainbow Six: Siege, the character she voices is Ash, a female FBI operator working for Team Rainbow. She voiced Ash in Arknights as well.

Theatre
Patricia has performed in theaters across Canada, the U.S. and the UK. She has been nominated for three META/MECCA (Montreal English Theatre/Critics Circle Awards) for “Best Lead Actress” playing the roles Rosalind in As You Like it and Jacqueline in Trench Patterns (a captain with PTSD). She has also been featured in Equus, Pinter plays and as the title role in Ibsen's Hedda Gabler. She was last seen in the Toronto's 2016 Next Stage Festival, performing the Fringe hit Blood Wild by Paul Van Dyck.

Personal life
She grew up in Marquette, Michigan. In addition to her acting career, she is a songwriter and singer for the band Summersett, and was a competitive ice dancer representing Quebec in 2002 as senior Quebec Sectional Champion with former partner Simon Roberge. She has three sisters: Annette Summersett (born June 1980), Kathryn Summersett (born June 1985) and Jane Summersett, all artists, who perform music together.

In 2017, Patricia co-founded a charity called GeekU.P.

She is currently based in Montreal and Los Angeles.

Filmography

Film
The Jogger (short, 2013) - Girlfriend
Gingerbread House (short, 2013) - Mother
The Smurfs 2 (2013) - Smurf Voice #2 (voice), Off-camera Voice
The Death of Kao-Kuk (2015) - Actress (voice)
The Saver (2015) - Rachel
Dear Mr. President (short, 2016) - Police Spokeswoman
Darwin (2016) - Mother (voice)
I'm Coming Over (2016) - Composer, Producer, Writer
mother! (2017) - ConsolerFareed (short, 2018) - Mrs. MarkellMaz (2018) - Deb MazenetThe Great Traveller (2019) - Berenice

TelevisionEmma (TV Mini-series, 2009), Season 1, Episode 3 - DancerSex & Ethnicity (2014), Season 1, Episodes 1 & 8 - Carole19-2 (2014), Season 1, Episodes 4 & 5 - Dr. ZoéHelix (2015), Season 2, Episodes 1, 8, 9, 10, 11 & 12 - Lt. Commander WingerFatal Vows (2015), Season 4, Episode 12 - HelenReal Detective (2016), Season 1, Episode 8 - Merrie CameronLost Generation (2017), Season 1, Episodes 1 & 10 - Detective BendelThe Bold Type (2017), Season 1, Episode 6 - Dr. Elysa HendricksLevel Up Norge (2017), Season 7, Episode 89 - Princess Zelda (voice)Bellevue (2017), Season 1, Episode 1 - Nikki RyderThe Disappearance (2017), Season 1, Episode 2 - Anne-Marie DuvalGaro: Vanishing Line (2018), Season 1, Episode 21 - Additional Voices (voice)Broken Trust (TV Mini-series, 2018), Season 1, Episode 8 - KellyThe Truth About the Harry Quebert Affair (TV Mini-series, 2018), Season 1, Episode 1 - Reporter #1The Detectives (2018), Season 2, Episode 4 - CathyStreet Legal (2019), Season 1, Episode 3 - MaeveCamp Camp (2019), Season 4, Episode 14 - Ainsley (voice)

Video gamesBeowulf: The Game (2007) - Grendel's Mother (voice)Suikoden Tierkreis (2008) - Diadora / Servillah (voice)Need for Speed: Hot Pursuit (2010) - Narrator (voice)Assassin's Creed: Rogue (2014) - Hope Jensen (voice)Assassin's Creed: Syndicate (2015) - Galina Voronina (voice)Rainbow Six: Siege (2015) - Ash (voice)Far Cry Primal (2016) - Wenja (voice)Deus Ex: Mankind Divided (2016) - Additional Voices (voice)For Honor (2017) - Knight Warden / Warmonger (voice)The Legend of Zelda: Breath of the Wild (2017) - Princess Zelda (voice)Dungeon Hunter Champions (2018) - Player (voice)Omensight (2018) - General Draga / Witch“Omensight: Definitive Edition” Gets December Release on Nintendo Switch, The Geekiary, November 29, 2018Tom Clancy's Ghost Recon Breakpoint (2019) - Paula MaderaGuardian Tales (2020) - Bianca (voice)Hyrule Warriors: Age of Calamity (2020) - Princess Zelda (voice)Arknights'' 2021 - Ash (voice)

References

Other sources
Patricia Summersett - Patricia Summersett on Dean Panaro Talent
Patricia Summersett - Patricia Summersett on Glenn Talent Management
Patricia Summersett answers YOUR questions! (Voice of Princess Zelda) - YouTube
Patricia Summersett Video Game samples - YouTube
Episode 10 – Patricia Summersett - The Spirit Bros Podcast

External links

Patricia Summersett on Vimeo

1982 births
Living people
20th-century American actresses
21st-century American actresses
20th-century Canadian actresses
21st-century Canadian actresses
Actresses from Montreal
American expatriate actresses in Canada
Anglophone Quebec people
Canadian film actresses
Canadian television actresses
Canadian video game actresses
Canadian voice actresses
Place of birth missing (living people)